"Baby You're a Haunted House" is a song by Gerard Way, released as a single on October 26, 2018. It was Gerard’s newest song since 2016 and was released for Halloween. The song features Way's brother and My Chemical Romance bandmate Mikey Way on bass guitar, Ian Fowles of The Aquabats on guitar, and Tom Rasulo on drums.

Background
In a statement, Way said that he wrote the song "about all our inner ghosts and demons and what it feels like being in love and having to deal with your own internal horror show. I tried not to really overthink it too much as I really wanted to start getting music out into the world again and sharing my art." Way also stated that the haunted house on the cover "was built by a model maker named Damien Webb and it kind of inspired me to put the song out for Halloween, as it seemed fitting with the holiday".

Critical reception
Brittany Spanos of Rolling Stone called the song "Halloween-ready" and a "fuzzy power-pop song [that] reflects the Britpop twist in [Way's] sound from his 2014 debut solo album Hesitant Alien". Braudie Blais-Billie of Pitchfork also noted the track's Halloween theme. Chad Childers of Loudwire stated that "While the title may suggest something spooky, the song is anything but. This bouncy little number is very accessible and the type of song that may have you singing along unconsciously due to its catchy nature."

Music video
The lyric video was shot by Claire Marie Vogel, who had previously worked with My Chemical Romance, and the original concept for the video is by Mikey Way, who said he "could picture a video like one of those old monster cartoons from the '60s of musicians toe tapping and Beatle-bopping to this song." The intro of the video is a reference to Ed Sullivan introducing The Beatles on his show in 1964.

Personnel
 Gerard Way – lead and backing vocals
 Mikey Way – bass guitar
 Ian Fowles – lead guitar, rhythm guitar
 James Dewees – keyboards
 Tom Rasulo – drums, percussion

Charts

References

2018 singles
2018 songs
American power pop songs
Gerard Way songs
Songs about ghosts
Halloween songs
Songs written by Gerard Way
Songs written by Mikey Way